Pfohl is a German surname. Notable people with the surname include:

Cornelia Pfohl (born 1971), German archer
Ferdinand Pfohl (1862–1949), German music critic, writer and classical composer
Lawrence Pfohl (born 1958), American professional wrestler known by the ring name Lex Luger
Margaret V. Pfohl (born 1998), American author

German-language surnames